Jaago is a 1985 Hindi film.

Soundtrack
"Ab To Jaago" - Anwari
"Ant Na Dekho Garibon Ka" - Mahendra Kapoor, Surendra Joshi
"Gulon Se Rang Chura Ke" - Mohammed Rafi, Kamal Sinha
"Main To Akela Chala" - Jaisingh, Pratibha Nature
"Sun Le Jahan Wale" - Govind Prasad
"Zindagi Hai Chaar Din Ki" - Mahendra Kapoor, Asha Bhosle

References

External links
 

1985 films
1980s Hindi-language films